Erythromma is a genus of damselfly in the family Coenagrionidae. It contains the following species:
Erythromma lindenii  – Blue-Eye
Erythromma najas  – Large Redeye
Erythromma viridulum  – Small Redeye

References

External links

Coenagrionidae
Taxa named by Toussaint de Charpentier
Zygoptera genera